Thellusson is a given name. Notable people with the name include:

Thomas Thellusson Carter (1808–1901), significant figure in the Victorian Church of England
Frederick Thellusson, 4th Baron Rendlesham (1798–1852), British Conservative Party politician
Frederick Thellusson, 5th Baron Rendlesham (1840–1911), British Conservative politician
Peter Thellusson, 1st Baron Rendlesham (1761–1808), British merchant, banker and politician
Peter Thellusson (1737–1797), Swiss businessman and banker who settled in London
Claud Thomas Thellusson Wood MC (1885–1961), Bishop of Bedford

See also
Thellusson v Woodford (1799) 4 Ves 227 is an English trusts law case
Hôtel Thellusson, luxurious hôtel particulier, built in 1778 by Claude-Nicolas Ledoux